Thor Harald Hansen (June 23, 1947 – December 5, 2018) was a Norwegian professional poker player. He was recruited by Larry Flynt to play poker for him after Hansen played against him in Las Vegas in the mid-1990s. He has two WSOP bracelets, one from the 1988 WSOP in Seven-card stud, and then later in Deuce to Seven Lowball in the 2002 WSOP. He finished in the money four times during the 2006 WSOP, coming in second place in the $3,000 Omaha Hi/Lo event.

Biography 
He was part owner of the company Poker Blue and was awarded the first Norwegian Poker Player of the Year award in 2005. He was considered by many Norwegian poker players as their "Godfather".

In 2007, Hansen cashed in the money at the $10,000 No Limit Hold'em Main Event Championship coming in 134th place out of a field of 6,358 players, winning $58,570, and finished in 8th at the $50,000 H.O.R.S.E event, earning an additional $188,256. As of 2009, his total live tournament winnings exceed $2,600,000. His 46 WSOP cashes account for $1,165,960 of his total winnings. 

In 1999, Thor married Marcella Braswell on Catalina Island, California. The couple divided their time between California and Las Vegas, Nevada. 

Hansen was diagnosed with terminal cancer, and went through chemotherapy treatment.  Hansen died in December 5, 2018.

WSOP Bracelets

References

Norwegian poker players
1947 births
2018 deaths
Deaths from cancer in the United States
World Series of Poker bracelet winners